Jeffrey Steitzer (born November 28, 1951) is an American voice actor, stage actor, and director. He is best known for being the voice of the multiplayer announcer in the Halo series.

Career
Jeff Steitzer studied theater at the University of Northern Iowa and graduated in 1975.

Steitzer has done voice acting for multiple video games, and is most known for voicing the multiplayer announcer in the Halo video game series. Initially he auditioned and was told he would play Master Chief, but was given the role of the multiplayer announcer.

In addition to being a voice actor, Steitzer is also a stage actor and director. In 1985, Steitzer became a resident director for ACT Theatre, and became the organization's artistic director in 1988. He remained the artistic director until he resigned in 1994. The theatre was successful during his six-year tenure. He has also directed for other organizations such as the Seattle Shakespeare Company.

He has played numerous roles on stage including Dr. Watson, Ebenezer Scrooge, and Gerald Ford. He played Frank in the premiere of Steven Dietz's play Private Eyes (1996) and Garroway in the premiere of Dietz's play Over the Moon (2003), adapted from The Small Bachelor. He also appeared on Broadway in Mary Poppins (2006) replacing another actor as Admiral Boom and the Bank Chairman, and in Inherit the Wind (2007) as the Mayor. Steitzer has acted on radio in Imagination Theatre radio dramas, and has narrated several audiobooks.

Filmography

Television
 The Fugitive (2001) - Art Zimmerman (recurring)
 Law & Order: "Fame" (2006) - Earl Woodlief
 30 Rock: "Don Geiss, America and Hope" (2010) - Priest
 The Cleveland Show: "Another Bad Thanksgiving" (2010)

Video games
Pajama Sam 3: You Are What You Eat from Your Head to Your Feet (2000) - General Beetfoot
The Operative: No One Lives Forever (2000) - Baron Dumas
Aliens versus Predator 2 (2001) - General Vassili Rykov, Additional Voices
Halo: Combat Evolved (2001) - Announcer
Halo 2 (2004) - Announcer
Grand Theft Auto: Vice City Stories (2006) - The Chief, Peter Bradbury / The Fisherman
Halo 3 (2007) - Multiplayer Announcer
Halo 3: ODST (2009) - Firefight Announcer 
Halo: Reach (2010) - Multiplayer Announcer
Halo 4 (2012) - Multiplayer Announcer
Halo 5: Guardians (2015) - Multiplayer Announcer
Halo Wars 2 (2017) - Announcer
Grand Theft Auto Online: The Doomsday Heist (2017) - Agent ULP / Bernard
Halo Infinite (2021) - Multiplayer Announcer
Grand Theft Auto Online: The Criminal Enterprises (2022) - Agent ULP / Bernard

References

External links
 

1951 births
20th-century American male actors
21st-century American male actors
American theatre directors
American male stage actors
American male video game actors
American male voice actors
Living people
People from Deadwood, South Dakota